Au Tau is an area of Yuen Long District, Hong Kong, located directly east of Yuen Long Town.

Pok Oi Hospital is located in Au Tau.

Pun Uk, a former mansion and a Grade I Historic Building is located in Au Tau, next to the hospital.

Tung Shing Lei is a village located in Au Tau.

Administration
For electoral purposes, Au Tau is located in the Shap Pat Heung East constituency of the Yuen Long District Council. It was formerly represented by Lee Chun-wai, who was elected in the 2019 elections until July 2021.

Transportation
Castle Peak Road passes through the northern part of Au Tau.

Au Tau station is proposed as being an intermediate station of the MTR Northern Link.

Education
Au Tau is in Primary One Admission (POA) School Net 74. Within the school net are multiple aided schools (operated independently but funded with government money) and one government school: Yuen Long Government Primary School (元朗官立小學).

References

External links

 Pictures of Tung Shing Lei

Areas of Hong Kong
Yuen Long District